Holiday House, Inc., is a publishing house founded in 1935 in New York City, specializing in children's literature.  It is a member of the Children's Book Council. The logo of the Holiday House little boy is by E. H. Shepard, the illustrator of The Wind in the Willows and the Winnie the Pooh books, from the publisher's original edition of The Reluctant Dragon by Kenneth Grahame.

Holiday House's books have been the recipient of awards, including the Caldecott Medal and the Newbery. 

Notable authors include Yuyi Morales, Polly Horvath, Gail Gibbons, and David A. Adler. The house publishes 120 titles a year. These titles include a number of translations from other langages, such as The Postman from Space, by Guillaume Perreault.

Holiday House was acquired by the investment firm Trustbridge Partners in 2016 and is part of Trustbridge Global Media.

In 2020, Trustbridge launched the sister imprint Pixel+Ink.

References

External links

Book publishing companies based in New York (state)
Publishing companies established in 1935
1935 establishments in New York City
Children's book publishers